Prince Albert Kamehameha, formally Albert Edward Kauikeaouli Kaleiopapa a Kamehameha (May 20, 1858 – August 27, 1862), was the only son of Kamehameha IV and Queen Emma, who during his short life was the Crown Prince of the Kingdom of Hawaii. He was the godson of Queen Victoria.

Early life
He was born May 20, 1858, in the residence of Ihikapukalani that his father had built for his mother. The residence, oddly, had two names; the makai side was known as Kauluhinano, and the mauka side was known as Ihikapukalani.
Created Crown prince and heir apparent to the throne of the Kingdom of Hawaii on May 24, 1858, he was styled "His Royal Highness the Prince of Hawaii" by the Privy Council. Adored by the native Hawaiian public, he was affectionately known as Ka Haku O Hawaii ("the Lord of Hawaii") and was believed to be last hope of the Kamehameha Dynasty.  His birth was celebrated for many days not only in Honolulu, but throughout the islands. He was the first child to be born to a reigning Hawaiian monarch since Prince Keawe Aweula-o-Kalani in 1839, son of Kamehameha III, and the last ever to be born from any reigning Hawaiian monarch.

He was given the Hawaiian name Kauikeaouli Kaleiopapa after his adoptive grandfather Kauikeaouli who reigned as Kamehameha III. Translated from the Hawaiian language it means "the beloved child of a long line of chiefs, a sign in the heavens."  The King and Queen called their son "Baby". However, when they spoke of him to their kahu (caretakers), it was as Kauikeaouli, which the Hawaiian people also used. He was named Albert Edward in honor of Albert Edward, Prince of Wales, the future King Edward VII of the United Kingdom. Despite the great differences in their kingdoms, Queen Emma and Queen Victoria would exchange letters and become lifelong friends.

Ten days after his birth, Mary Allen, second wife of the Chief Justice of the Supreme Court Elisha Hunt Allen, had a son Frederick. The two children became playmates, and Allen described the prince as "an unusually sweet child, gentle and gentlemanly in his manners, bright and precocious and of a most happy, serene temperament".

Albert during his life was also made an honorary member of Fire Engine Company Number Four in Honolulu and was given his own Company Four red uniform. It was said that he would rather become a fireman. His four birthdays were national holidays.

Death
In August 1862, the usually serene child became restless, and his medical condition got progressively worse. The newspapers of the time reported the illness as "brain fever," now known as meningitis. Writing much later, Queen Liliuokalani blamed the father for putting the child under a cold-water faucet as punishment for throwing a tantrum over a pair of boots. The parents did mistake a fever for sunstroke. A modern medical historian and Honolulu physician analyzed the possible causes of Albert's death. They concluded the Prince most likely died from a case of appendicitis.  Both the local and British naval doctors did not know the cause nor the treatment of his illness.

As the prince's condition declined, Kamehameha IV and Queen Emma made a personal request to Queen Victoria to send a bishop from the Anglican Church to baptize the prince. They also requested Queen Victoria to be his godmother. Queen Victoria consented to both requests, and sent as a baptismal gift an elaborate silver christening cup, about three feet high. Bishop Thomas Nettleship Staley was sent but would not arrive until October. As the prince grew sicker, the American minister Ephraim W. Clark from Kawaiahao Church baptized the child on August 23. The Episcopal liturgy was used with the British Commissioner William Webb Follett Synge standing in for the godparents.

The Prince died on August 27, 1862, at the palace, four days after his baptism. His parents were grief-stricken, as they knelt by the side of the Prince's bed. The Queen took her dead boy in her arms and, weeping over him, said to him, "My Baby, my own Baby and you did not know me!"
Prince Albert's funeral was held on  September 7, 1862. He was temporarily placed in a temporary tomb in front of the palace below a tamarind tree. Before the lid of the coffin closed, the King removed the star of diamonds from his uniform and laid it on the chest of his only son.

Afterwards, the King fell into despair, blaming himself for the loss of his son. The Queen rarely left the grave of her child and was given the name Kaleleokalani (The Flight of the Heavenly Chief), in memory of Albert, by her husband. The King then ordered the construction of the Royal Mausoleum in Nuuanu Valley to house his son's body, since the old mausoleum had become too full. 
Today, the mausoleum is burial site of most of the members of the Hawaiian royal family. The King's depression was so severe that he considered abdicating the throne. A year later, he would die as well. To express her grief, Queen Emma changed her name to Kaleleo(n)ālani "Flight of the Heavenly Chief(s)," to symbolize her double loss.

Legacy
His death left his father without a constitutionally recognized heir. Consequently, after his father's death in 1864, the Kuhina Nui (Albert's aunt) had to fill in the vacant office of head of state for a day until the Legislature could decide upon the accession of his uncle as king. 
Besides the Royal Mausoleum, the four-year-old prince left other marks on Hawaii. The area of Princeville on the island of Kauai was named in honor of the young prince by Scotsman Robert Crichton Wyllie, Minister of Foreign Affairs to Kamehameha III and IV, after a visit by the Kamehameha IV family in 1860. In 1867 Elisha Allen bought the property and developed it into a sugarcane plantation.

The Leiopapa a Kamehameha Building (the State Office Tower) in downtown Honolulu is also named for him. According to local folklore, his ghost is said to inhabit the building at 235 South Beretania Street, .

Family tree

Paternal

Maternal

References

Bibliography

External links

 

1858 births
1862 deaths
Burials at the Royal Mausoleum (Mauna ʻAla)
Hawaiian Kingdom Anglicans
Heirs apparent who never acceded
Heirs to the Hawaiian throne
Princes of Hawaii
Royalty of the Hawaiian Kingdom
Royalty who died as children
Sons of kings